Culex erythrothorax is a mosquito species that appears in Southern California. It is also known as the Tule Mosquito due to its preference for breeding in tule plants. The species has a brownish-orange color. It is a confirmed vector of West Nile virus.

References

erythrothorax
Insect vectors of human pathogens
Insects described in 1907